Jan Kowalczyk (18 December 1941 – 24 February 2020) was a Polish show jumping competitor. He competed in the 1968, 1972 and 1980 Olympics and won an individual gold and a team silver medal in 1980.

References 

1941 births
2020 deaths
Olympic gold medalists for Poland
Olympic silver medalists for Poland
Equestrians at the 1980 Summer Olympics
Olympic equestrians of Poland
Polish male equestrians
Olympic medalists in equestrian
People from Cieszyn County
Sportspeople from Silesian Voivodeship
Medalists at the 1980 Summer Olympics